Asota sericea is a moth of the family Erebidae first described by Frederic Moore in 1878. It is found in India.

The wingspan is 59–64 mm.

References

Asota (moth)
Moths of Asia
Moths described in 1878